is a city located in Gifu, Japan. , the city had an estimated population of 24,726, and a population density of 31 persons per km2, in 8,905 households. The official kanji for the city is actually 飛驒, which uses the old rendering of the 騨 character. However, the 驒 characters is not included on the official list of usable characters (as decided by the Ministry of Internal Affairs and Communications), so the 騨 character is often used outside of the city.

Geography
Hida is the northernmost city in Gifu Prefecture, and is located in the northern part of the Hida Highlands bordering on Toyama Prefecture to the north. The majority of the area of the city is forested, with many mountains exceeding 1,000 meters within the city borders.  The northeastern edge of the Hida Mountain range exceeds 2,000 meters. Most of the population is concentrated along river terraces along the Jinzū River and the Takahara River.

Climate
The city has a climate characterized by hot and humid summers, and mild winters (Köppen climate classification Dfa).

Neighbouring municipalities
Gifu Prefecture
Takayama
Shirakawa
Toyama Prefecture
Toyama
Nanto

Demographics
Per Japanese census data, the population of Hida has decreased steadily over the past 50 years.

History
The area around Hida was part of traditional Hida Province.  During the Edo period,  the area was tenryō territory under the direct control of the  Tokugawa shogunate. During the post-Meiji restoration cadastral reforms, the area was organised into Yoshiki District, Gifu. On July 1, 1889 with the establishment of the modern municipalities system, the town of Furukawa  and the villages of Kawai and Miyagawa were created. The  modern city of Hida was established on February 1, 2004, from the merger of these municipalities with the town of  Kamioka.

Government
Hida has a mayor-council form of government with a directly elected mayor and a unicameral city legislature of 14 members

Economy
The main two traditional economies in the city are the production of sake and traditional Japanese candles. The Furukawa area of the city is known for both of these crafts, while the Kamioka section is mainly known for its sake production.

Education
Hida has five public elementary schools, two public middle schools and one combined elementary/middle school operated by the city government. The city has two public high schools operated by the Gifu Prefectural Board of Education. Tokyo University's Super-Kamiokande neutrino observatory together with the data processing centre (Kamioka Observatory) has been located in Kamioka since 2002.

Transportation

Railway
 JR Tōkai  - Takayama Main Line
  -  -  -   -   -  -

Highway
 Tōkai-Hokuriku Expressway, which connects the cities of Nagoya and Gifu with Toyama.

Sister city relations
 - Leutasch, Austria, friendship city since January 23, 1998
 - Libin, Belgium, sister city since September 9, 1996
 - Xingang, Chiayi, Taiwan, sister city since October 13, 2017

Local attractions

Festivals in Hida
Furukawa Festival, a famous festival in Gifu Prefecture, is held every April.

Popular Culture

Kimi no Na Wa 
Hida Furukawa was featured in several key locations in the popular 2016 animated film, Kimi no Na Wa (君の名は, Your Name).

References

External links

 Hida City official website (Japanese, English, Korean and Chinese)

Cities in Gifu Prefecture
Hida, Gifu